Mehseiah is a minor figure in the Hebrew Bible, the grandfather of Baruch ben Neriah and father of Neriah. According to the Talmud, he was a prophet. 

Prophets in Judaism